Trideviyaan is an  Indian Hindi Thriller, Comedy television series,  which was broadcast on SAB TV. The series was produced by Full House Media of Amir and Sonali Jaffar.

Plot
The plot follows the story of two girls - Dhanushree "Dhannu" and Tanuja "Tannu" who are caring housewives and also, work as secret agents for their father-in-law, Dinanath Chauhan alias Agent Himalaya. Dhannu alias Agent Laal Kila is married to Dinanath's elder son Shaurya Chauhan who is an honest and brave police inspector and Tannu alias Agent Hawa Mahal marries Dinanath's younger son, Garv Chauhan who is a crime news reporter. On their wedding day, when the time comes to leave the maternal home, Tannu locks the door of her room and refuses to leave. When asked, she confesses to Dinanath that she likes Garv but doesn't wish to go to her marital home and sacrifice her profession, which is a secret. But Dinanath reveals that he is aware of her secret, that she is UCA (Under Cover Army)'s secret agent and then he mentions that he is also a UCA agent, Agent Himalaya and henceforth she would continue in her profession by joining his secret army with another agent. Tannu then gladly accepts to leave for her new home and also thinks that the agent who would be joining her is her brother-in-law, Shaurya. On their way, they stop at a temple to complete Dhannu's manner regarding this marriage. But, as they were about to leave the temple after completing the "Mannat", a group of thieves threatens the entire Chauhan family, and they are taken to a distant place. There it is revealed to us that the second agent is Dhannu! The duo then beat up the goons and all the family members manage to escape. But Garv and Tannu are unable to spend time together on their wedding night as Tannu is called to Dinanath's secret lab where she is introduced to many new gadgets. But one day, Dinanath's younger daughter Manya Chauhan a.k.a. Mannu discovers that Tannu, Dhannu, and Dinanath are secret agents and wants to join their team as "Agent Qutub Minar" or else she will tell everyone, especially her mother, the secret.

On a fake mission, which coincidentally turns real, Mannu saves her co-agents and is permitted to receive training and become an agent and then the agents become known as "Trideviyaan". They successfully conceal their secret identities from Dinanath's wife Suhasini Chauhan, his mother Damyanti Chauhan who is a kleptomaniac, Fatteh Mama - the servant, the paying guests, and even from Shaurya and Garv. With Dhannu's strength, Tannu's speed, and Mannu's power of voice, they are a formidable team.

Cast

Main 
Aishwarya Sakhuja as Dhanashree Shaurya Chauhan aka Dhannu / Agent Laal Kila: Shaurya's wife, Dinanath and Suhasini's elder daughter-in-law, Damyanti's elder granddaughter-in-law; Mannu's elder sister-in-law. (Bhabhi)
Samaira Rao as Tanuja Garv Chauhan aka Tannu / Agent Hawa Mahal/ Bijli (duplicate): Garv's wife, Dinanath and Suhasini's younger daughter-in-law, Damyanti's younger granddaughter-in-law; Mannu's younger sister-in-law. (Bhabhi)
Shalini Sahuta as Manya Dinanath Chauhan aka Mannu / Agent Qutub Minar: Dinanath and Suhasini's daughter, Shaurya, and Garv's younger sister,Damyanti's  granddaughter; Prem's love interest
Rituraj Singh as Dinanath Chauhan 'Dad Ji', DN / Agent Himalaya:Damyanti's son; Dhannu and Tannu's father-in-law, Suhasini's husband, Shaurya, Garv and Mannu's father
Anshul Trivedi as Shaurya Dinanath Chauhan: a police officer, Dhannu's husband,Dinanath and Suhasini's elder son; Damyanti's grandson;Garv and Mannu's elder brother
Winy Tripathi as Garv Dinanath Chauhan: a crime reporter,Dinanath and Suhasini's younger son; Tannu's husband, Shaurya's younger brother;Mannu's elder brother
Dhruvee Haldanker as Suhasini Dinanath Chauhan aka Su: Dinanath's wife, Dhannu and Tannu's mother-in-law, Shaurya, Garv and Mannu's mother; Damyanti's daughter-in-law
Sameer S Sharma as Fateh Singh / Fateh Mama; an innocent worker at DN's house

Recurring 
Charu Rohatgi as Damyanti Chauhan/Dadi: Suhasini's mother-in-law; Dhannu and Tannu's grandmother-in-law, Dinanath's mother, Shaurya, Garv and Mannu's grandmother
Shraman Jain as Amar Bhatia/Dr. Amar Bhatia (fake identity),
 Prem's best friend
Aditya Kapadia as Prem Kumar/Promila Bhattacharya Bhatia (fake identity):Amar's best friend; Mannu's love interest
Ranjeet as Gamosha

Cameos 
KK Goswami as Missile Thief
Anita Hassanandani as Mohini Iyer
Ali Asgar as Katappi (Guddu)
Aryan Prajapati as Fake Dada Ji
Praneet Bhat as Kilmish Jadugar
Sweety Walia as Chanda Chadda
Gaurav Wadhwa as Manav (NRI)
Shafaq Naaz as one of the fake Trideviyaan

References

External links
 Trideviyaan on Sony LIV

2016 Indian television series debuts
Hindi-language television shows
Television shows set in Mumbai
Sony SAB original programming
Indian thriller television series